André Nemec (born 1972) is an American writer, showrunner and producer.

His screenplays include Mission: Impossible – Ghost Protocol and Teenage Mutant Ninja Turtles.  He is also the co-creator of CBS's summer hit series Zoo, as well as ABC dramas October Road, Life on Mars, and Happy Town. Other past credits include Alias, Fastlane, Going to California, and Profiler. He was also an executive producer of the 2021 American live-action series based on Cowboy Bebop.

Personal life
Nemec was born and raised in a Jewish family in Yonkers, New York, where he attended Riverdale Country School with longtime writing and producing partner Josh Appelbaum. He then went on to attend University of Southern California. After college, he reunited with Appelbaum and subsequently broke into the entertainment industry as a television writer.

Career
Nemec's list of early credits include Early Edition for CBS, Going to California for Showtime and Fastlane for FOX. Recognized for his writing talent by J. J. Abrams, Nemec spent three years working on ABC's Alias, where he rose to the level of co-executive producer. He then went on to co-create and executive produce ABC's October Road, Life on Mars, and Happy Town.

Nemec was then re-approached by friend and colleague J. J. Abrams to write Mission: Impossible – Ghost Protocol, the fourth installment in the multibillion-dollar film franchise starring Tom Cruise. This was Nemec's first produced feature film. Building on the successful experience Nemec had with Paramount Pictures on Mission: Impossible – Ghost Protocol, Nemec and Appelbaum were tapped to pen a reboot of the Beverly Hills Cop film franchise, starring Eddie Murphy.  Other film writing projects include the 2014 installment of the Teenage Mutant Ninja Turtles franchise, as well as its sequel, and unaccredited writing work on Now You See Me and G.I. Joe: Retaliation.

Nemec and Appelbaum also remain active in television where they are writing and developing (with longtime collaborators and friends Scott Rosenberg and Jeff Pinkner) under their banner MIDNIGHT-RADIO.  As well, the aforementioned foursome, are writing and developing a Sci-Fi cable project for Steven Spielberg's DreamWorks Studio. He frequently collaborates with a tightly knit group of film professionals which include J. J. Abrams, Damon Lindelof, Adam Horowitz, Alex Kurtzman, Roberto Orci, Edward Kitsis, Jeff Pinkner, and Bryan Burk.

Filmography

Films

Television

References

External links
 

Television producers from New York (state)
American television writers
Living people
Skydance Media people
Jewish American screenwriters
Tisch School of the Arts alumni
People from Yonkers, New York
1972 births
American male television writers
Screenwriters from New York (state)
Riverdale Country School alumni